Aleksander Mitt (8 February 1903 in Tartu, Russian Empire – 18 April 1942 in Kirov Oblast, Russia) was an Estonian speed skater who competed at the 1928 and 1936 Winter Olympics.

In 1928 he finished 22nd in the 500 metres event, 20th in the 1500 metres event and 21st in the 5000 metres competition.

In 1936 Mitt finished 22nd in the 500, 1500 and 5000 meters events. In 10000 meters event he did not finish.

He was executed in a Soviet prison camp during World War II.

References

External links
 

1903 births
1942 deaths
Sportspeople from Tartu
People from the Governorate of Livonia
Estonian male speed skaters
Olympic speed skaters of Estonia
Speed skaters at the 1928 Winter Olympics
Speed skaters at the 1936 Winter Olympics
Estonian prisoners of war
Estonian people executed by the Soviet Union